Ratu Wame Ganilau Lewaravu (born 24 September 1983, in Lautoka) is a Fijian rugby union player. He plays as a lock.

Career

Club
He currently plays for Sale Sharks having previously played for Overmach Parma and London Welsh.

Debut
His first match for Fiji was on 19 May 2007, in a 3–8 loss to rivals Samoa.

World Cup 2007
Lewaravu was selected for the 2007 Rugby World Cup finals, playing in four matches. His more recent match was at 14 June 2008, in a 7–11 loss to New Zealand Māori. He currently holds 12 caps for Fiji.

References

External links
Fiji profile
Scrum profile

1983 births
Living people
Fijian rugby union players
Rugby union locks
Fiji international rugby union players
Fijian expatriate rugby union players
Expatriate rugby union players in England
Expatriate rugby union players in France
Fijian expatriate sportspeople in England
Fijian expatriate sportspeople in France
Sale Sharks players
London Welsh RFC players
Sportspeople from Lautoka
I-Taukei Fijian people
People educated at Suva Grammar School